High Mountain Rangers was an American adventure drama series about a group of highly trained wilderness search and rescue/law enforcement officers in Tahoe, Nevada.

It starred Robert Conrad as Jesse Hawkes and also starred his two sons, Christian Conrad and Shane Conrad. Robert's daughter Joan was the executive producer. 12 episodes were broadcast, from January 2 until April 9, 1988 on CBS, before the show was cancelled. The series also had a spin-off titled Jesse Hawkes.

The series was centered on Jesse Hawkes, an ex-Marine who started the High Mountain Rangers 35 years before the pilot. He retired after hauling his long-time nemesis, murderous criminal mastermind T.J. Cousins, to justice. Spared the death penalty on a legal technicality, Cousins instead was given life imprisonment without eligibility for parole. Meanwhile, Jesse's eldest son Matt tries out for the HMRs and eventually becomes the team's #2 Ranger...after Merlin (guest star Rick J. Porter as Ranger "Merlin" Pierce) who succeeded Jesse as director. Then Cousins gets broken out of jail by a drug dealer needing his mountain skills, and fatally ambushes Merlin. Now, as the team's third director, Matt urges his father out of retirement to help the Rangers recapture Cousins.

Cast
Each Ranger had a CALL SIGN (ie TOP GUN, MERLIN, FLYING TIGER); this was used whenever the HMRs were in the field. 
Robert Conrad as Jesse "Top Gun" Hawkes
Christian Conrad as Matt "Flying Tiger" Hawkes
Shane Conrad as Cody Hawkes
Russell Todd as Jim "Flash" Cutler
Pa Neumüller (billed as P.A. Christian) as Robin "Frostbite" Kelly
Timothy Erwin (Robert Conrad's real-life son-in-law) as Izzy "the Pocatello Kid" Flowers
Eugene Williams as Tim "Black Magic" Hart
Tony Acierto as Frank "White Eagle" Avila
Guest star Rick J. Porter as Ranger "Merlin" Pierce

Episodes

References

External links

1988 American television series debuts
1988 American television series endings
Television shows set in Nevada
Television shows set in California
1980s American drama television series
English-language television shows
CBS original programming
Lake Tahoe